The Cocos flycatcher (Nesotriccus ridgwayi) is a species of bird in the family Tyrannidae. It is a small (13 cm) grey bird with a long bill.

Distribution and habitat 
It is endemic to Cocos Island off Costa Rica. Its natural habitats are subtropical or tropical moist lowland forest, subtropical or tropical swamps, subtropical or tropical moist montane forest, and subtropical or tropical moist shrubland.

Conservation
It is thought to be threatened by introduced species, particularly rats and feral cats, which prey on the species, and pigs which destroy habitat through foraging. There is no evidence yet of a decline, but is listed as Vulnerable due to its tiny range.

References

External links
BirdLife Species Factsheet.

Nesotriccus
Endemic birds of Costa Rica
Cocos flycatcher
Taxonomy articles created by Polbot